Chefchaouen is a province in the Moroccan economic region of Tanger-Tetouan-Al Hoceima. According to the 2014 national census in Morocco, the province has more than 457,432 inhabitants. The population is 87.45% rural.

The major cities and towns are:
 Bab Berred
 Bab Taza
 Brikcha
 Chefchaouen
 Jebha
 Moqrisset
 Zoumi

Subdivisions

The province is divided administratively into the following:

References

 
Chefchaouen